John Raphael Hagan (February 26, 1890 – September 28, 1946) was a bishop of the Catholic Church in the United States. He served as auxiliary bishop of the Diocese of Cleveland.

Biography
Born in Pittsburgh, Pennsylvania, John Hagan was ordained a priest on March 7, 1914.  On April 27, 1946 Pope Pius XII appointed him as the Titular Bishop of Limata and Auxiliary Bishop of Cleveland.  He was consecrated a bishop by Bishop Edward F. Hoban on May 28, 1946. The principal co-consecrators were Bishops James A. McFadden of Youngstown and John P. Treacy of La Crosse.  Hagan served as an auxiliary bishop for four months until his death on September 28, 1946, at the age of 56.

References

1890 births
1946 deaths
Religious leaders from Pittsburgh
American Roman Catholic clergy of Irish descent
Roman Catholic Diocese of Cleveland
20th-century American Roman Catholic titular bishops